Charles Edmond Henri de Coussemaker (19 April 1805 – 10 January 1876) was a French musicologist and ethnologist focusing mainly on the cultural heritage of French Flanders. With Michiel de Swaen and Maria Petyt, he was one of the most eminent defenders of the Dutch language in France.

Biography
(based on article by Damien Top)

Jurist and musician
Born in Belle into a family of jurists at the start of Napoleon’s Empire, from a child Edmond de Coussemaker proved to be enormously skilled as a singer and pianist. "At the age of ten, he read every type of music at first sight. He learned to play the violin and cello, but his preference made him particularly choose singing." ("À dix ans il lisait à première vue toute espèce de musique. Il apprit à jouer du violon et du violoncelle mais son goût le portrait particulièrement vers le chant.", François-Joseph Fétis in Biographie Universelle des musiciens, Didot, 1860-1865). He continued his studies at the Dowaai grammar school, where he studied violin with Joseph Baudouin and singing and harmony with Moreau, who was an organist at Saint Peter’s Church. In 1825, his father sent him to Paris to study law. In those days La Dame Blanche by Boïeldieu was a huge success there. Simultaneously, de Coussemaker started studying musical composition with Antonin Reicha and improved himself in the vocal arts with Felice Pellegrini, who performed Rossini’s operas in Paris at that time.

"Beauty, music, spirit: the Countess Merlin wears three crowns on her forehead of which only one would suffice to eternally adorn the head of a woman." "Beauté, musique, esprit, Mme la Comtesse Merlin porte sur son front trois couronnes dont une seule suffirait à consacrer pour toujours une tête de femme." (Les belles Femmes de Paris et de la province, The pretty Women of Paris and the countryside, 1829). De Coussemaker visited the salon of the pretty creole as well as those of the countesses Méroni and Sparre. The young Fleming met the whole of Paris there: Malibran, Musset, Liszt, Balzac, etc. His Romances and his Quadrilles amazed the Parisian aristocracy during their evenings. His style offered a peculiar synthesis: if La Captive, particularly close to Bellini, is one of his most inspired pieces, others like Les Rossignols borrow much of their vocality from Rossini while Amour et Patrie resembles Méhul most, with a recitative close to Berlioz.

When the "king-citizen" Louis-Philippe came into power, the nobility who had always patronised artistic institutions were forced back and were gradually replaced in the theatre by the wealthy bourgeoisie. After having obtained his certificate in December 1830, de Coussemaker became a trainee in Dowaai, where in 1832 he took up the thread of his studies in counterpoint, with Victor Lefebvre. As he wished to elevate the level of religious music, in imitation of Alexandre-Étienne Choron, initiator of the renewal of the mastership from 1807 on, de Coussemaker wrote a Mass as well as different motets a cappella: Kyrie, Sanctus, O Salutaris and Agnus dei.

Thanks to Luce-Varlet, artistic life was very intense in Douai. In the summer of 1832 Coussemaker set up a Société d’émulation musicale (Society for Musical Competition) in order to play his own pieces of music and those of other local composers with a grand orchestra: Victor Lefebvre, Henri Brovellio, Charles Choulet and Amédée Thomassin. This occurred during the winter when concerts were organised by this society and from 1840 to 1843. As Chief Commissioner of the Société Philharmonique de Douai (Philharmonic Society of Douai) responsible for the recruitment of artists, he invited very prestigious people like the violinist  Henri Vieuxtemps or the oboist player Stanislas Verroust to perform. On 5 December 1832 his Romance for two voices was performed: an Air varié for oboe, Chant for two voices a cappella and an Air for soprano with accompaniment by an orchestra. He also left manuscripts such as an essay about musical composition and fugue and an essay about harmony, which have apparently both been lost.

Edmond de Coussemaker sang regularly in his region (Belle, Aire-sur-la-Lys, Kassel...), interpreting his own melodies or the fashionable airs lyriques. Even an opera was performed, Le Diamant perdu (The Lost Diamond), in 1835. He left the composition of another opera, Imogène, unfinished. In 1836, in his native town, he married Marie Ignard de la Mouillère, to whom he dedicated a whole series of romances during their period of engagement. If his output does not bear testimony to an exceptional talent, his works are nevertheless firmly constructed and reflect the taste of the Restoration. He had a significant influence on production in the region, orientating it towards gothic romanticism in the so-called troubadour style. He became a judge at the District Court of Sint-Winoksbergen in 1843, after which he was appointed to the Court of Hazebrouck in 1845. Eventually, he became judge in Rijsel in 1858. In 1874, he was elected Mayor, maire, of Bourbourg, his last residence.

De Coussemaker came into contact with the intellectuals of Europe, especially with the German cultural world; the brothers Grimm and Baron Kervyn de Lettenhove for instance. Honoured in the Légion d'honneur in April 1847, titleholder of the Ordre de Saint-Grégoire le Grand, member of more than 25 academic societies, he was a member of the Académie royale de Belgique (Royal Academy of Belgium), correspondent for the Institut de France, and correspondent for the Académie des Inscriptions et des Belles-Lettres. His impressive library included 1600 valuable books and numerous musical instruments, part of which came into the possession of the Royal Library of Belgium in Brussels (Koninklijke Bibliotheek van België).

The Flemish Committee of France
Based on a report by Hippolyte Fortoul, Minister of Education and Religion, Napoleon III signed a decree on 13 September 1852 ordering a compilation of popular French poetry to be published (a publication which eventually never saw the daylight). Inspired by Barzaz Breiz: Chants populaires de la Bretagne, published by Théodore Hersart de La Villemarqué from 1839 onwards, de Coussemaker - as a correspondent for the Committee of Language, History and the Arts of France - collected the songs of his region together. His renown in circles of folklorists today is exclusively based on his Chants populaires des Flamands de France (popular songs of the Flemings in France) published in Gent, three years later.

De Coussemaker founded the Comité flamand de France (Flemish Committee of France) in 1853, which was tasked with putting a brake on the disappearance of the West Flemish dialect of the Dutch language, as spoken in French Flanders. With the priest Jules Auguste Lemire, he tried to maintain Dutch education in Catholic schools, especially in Belle, but due to the secularisation of education made compulsory by law, the Catholic hierarchy lost its influence. This brought a fatal coup to the survival of the Flemish dialect.

Defending the idea of a constitutional monarchy, close to certain liberals such as Félicité de Lamennais, the Count of Montalembert, and the chansonnier Béranger—who was an advocate of the House of Orléans and whose lyrics he had put into music—he remained profoundly attached to his country and rose to the position of General Counsellor of the Nord (nowadays the French region Nord-Pas de Calais). Volume IV of his Scriptores de musica medii aevi was about to be issued when, as his daughter Lilia wrote the day he died in Lille on 10 January 1876, exhausted by his affairs «our poor father finished with his weapons in his hands whilst serving the district».

De Coussemaker died in Bourbourg. Much of his archives and manuscripts disappeared after the town hall of Belle burned down in 1918.

Musicological contribution
His fascination with medieval music was first aroused while reading the Belgian musicologist François-Joseph Fétis’s Revue Musicale (musical revue). The first musicological work by de Coussemaker dates back to 1835. Even today his works remain a reference for matters relating to medieval musicology through their punctuality and precision: Mémoire sur Hucbald et ses traités de musique (1841), Histoire de I'harmonie au Moyen Âge (1852), Les harmonistes des XIIe-XIIIe (1864), Œuvres complètes du trouvère Adam de la Halle (1872). His compilations Scriptorum de Musica Medii aevi, 1864–1876, continue those by Prince Abbot Martin Gerbert. Among these historical writings, the Troubles religieux du XVIe dans la Flandre maritime (1560-1570), published in 1876, particularly merits being remembered.

He was one of the first to be devoted to research on medieval music and his numerous publications focused on subjects such as the Gregorian chant, the neumatic and measured notation, medieval instruments, and the theory and polyphony he called harmony. What distinguished Coussemaker from Fétis is the wide culture of the latter that enabled him to synthesise huge quantities of information in order to elaborate on abstract theories. De Coussemaker's approach is nonetheless more accurate, more scientific and more hypothetical.

From the original musical sources he had collected, he merely drew up descriptions based on attentive observation, resulting in him being heavily criticised by those who considered him more as a clever collector than as an historian. He proved the scientific value of facsimiles of manuscripts, but also made his own transcriptions into modern notation. His Scriptorum de musica, a compilation of writings (most of them in Latin) of several theoreticians of ancient music, is his most important work. He also established several critical editions of ancient music, including liturgical dramas from the Middle Ages and works by Adam de la Halle.

Writings
Hucbald moine de St. Armand et ses traités de musique (1839–1841)
Histoire de l'harmonie au Moyen Age (1852)
Chants populaires des Flamands de France (1856)
Les harmonistes des XII et XIII siècles (1864)
Œuvres complètes du trouvère Adam de la Halle (1872)
Scriptores de musica medii aevi (4 delen) (1864–1876)

Recordings
 Edmond de Coussemaker, Romances et chansons. Maryse Collache, soprano, Damien Top, ténor, Eric Hénon, piano. Symphonic Productions SyPr 041 2005.

Bibliography
 Abbé Dehaisnes, "Notice sur la vie et les travaux de M. de Coussemaker", in Bulletin de la Commission historique du Nord (1876).
 Guy Gosselin, L'âge d'or de la vie musicale à Douai 1800-1850 (Liège: Mardaga, 1994).
 Damien Top, "Een verloren perel: la musique d'Edmond de Coussemaker", in Annales du Comité flamand de France (2005).

External links
 
 Musical repertoire
 

1805 births
1876 deaths
19th-century classical composers
19th-century French composers
19th-century French musicologists
19th-century French writers
19th-century French male musicians
19th-century male writers
Flemish composers
Flemish writers
French folklorists
French male classical composers
French male writers
French Romantic composers
Knights of St. Gregory the Great
Members of the Académie des Inscriptions et Belles-Lettres
People from Nord (French department)
19th-century musicologists